In classical architecture, distyle in antis denotes a temple with the side walls extending to the front of the porch and terminating with two antae, the pediment being supported by two pilasters or sometimes caryatids. This is the earliest type of temple structure in the ancient Greek world. An example is the Siphnian Treasury in Delphi, built around 525 BCE.

Smaller two-column structures without antae are called distyle. The next evolution in temple design came with amphiprostyle, where four columns stand in line on the porch in front of a naos.

See also
Antae temple
Prostyle

References

Ancient Greek architecture